Steven Howard Oken (January 22, 1962 – June 17, 2004) was an American spree killer who raped and murdered three women in Maryland and Maine in November 1987. He was sentenced to death and executed in Maryland by lethal injection in 2004.

Murders
On November 1, 1987, Steven Oken, then 25, murdered 20-year-old Dawn Marie Garvin (nee Romano). She was found by her father on the bed in her White Marsh apartment, naked, with a condiment bottle protruding from her vagina and blood streaming from her forehead. Despite efforts of her father and paramedics to administer CPR, she was dead. An autopsy later revealed that she had died as the result of two contact gunshot wounds; one of the bullets entered at her left eyebrow and the other at her right ear.

Less than two weeks after Oken murdered Dawn Garvin, he sexually assaulted and murdered his sister-in-law, 43-year-old Patricia Antoinette Hirt, at his White Marsh townhouse, dumping her body along White Marsh Boulevard. He then fled to Kittery, Maine, where he murdered 25-year-old Lori Ward, the desk clerk at the motel in which he was staying.

Trials and execution
He was arrested in Maine on November 17, 1987, and was ultimately convicted and sentenced to life without parole for the murder of Ward. Oken was then returned to Maryland where he faced separate prosecutions for charges arising out of the other two murders.

Oken was found guilty and sentenced to die for the killing of Dawn Garvin in 1991. Following his conviction for Garvin's murder Oken pleaded guilty to killing Patricia Hirt, and received an additional life sentence.

Then-Governor Robert Ehrlich declined clemency and on June 17, 2004, at 9:18 p.m. local time, Steven Oken was pronounced dead after his execution by lethal injection at the Metropolitan Transition Center in Baltimore at age 42.

His last meal was a chicken patty, with potatoes and gravy, green beans, marble cake, milk, and fruit punch – the regular prison meal that day.

Personal life
Oken was adopted by a Jewish family, and attended Randallstown High School where he graduated in 1980. He stole drugs from his adoptive father's pharmacy and was drinking heavily.

See also
 Capital punishment in Maryland
 Capital punishment in the United States
 List of people executed in the United States in 2004

References

1962 births
2004 deaths
American people executed for murder
American rapists
American spree killers
20th-century American Jews
21st-century American Jews
Executed spree killers
People from Baltimore County, Maryland
21st-century executions by Maryland
Prisoners sentenced to life imprisonment by Maine
People executed by Maryland by lethal injection
People convicted of murder by Maine
People convicted of murder by Maryland
21st-century executions of American people
Executed people from Maryland